

Otto Sponheimer (19 December 1886  – 14 March 1961) was a German general (General of the Infantry) in the Wehrmacht during World War II who commanded several corps.  He was also a recipient of the Knight's Cross of the Iron Cross of Nazi Germany.

Awards and decorations

 Knight's Cross of the Iron Cross on  8 August 1941 as Generalleutnant and commander of 21. Infanterie-Division

References

Citations

Bibliography

 
 

1886 births
1961 deaths
German Army generals of World War II
Generals of Infantry (Wehrmacht)
Military personnel from Nuremberg
German Army personnel of World War I
Recipients of the Gold German Cross
Recipients of the Knight's Cross of the Iron Cross
People from the Kingdom of Bavaria